The Da Vinci Hoax is a non-fictional book written by Carl E. Olsen and Sandra Miesel for the express purpose of critiquing Dan Brown's novel The Da Vinci Code.  The book was first published in 2004 by Ignatius Press. According to Olson and Miesel, they wrote it out of concern that Brown's novel is popularizing theories, history and beliefs, which are used as the basis of the novel's plot, and defended by its author as factual, and that purport to expose Christianity as founded on lies that have been kept secret by the Roman Catholic Church throughout the centuries.

The authors state that the theories, while presented as great revelations of hidden knowledge, are actually based on elements of gnostic and feminist ideas.  They contend that the theories transparently contradict serious scholarship, and present detailed arguments and expositions against them.

Quote from the book

The misrepresentation of Christian beliefs in The Da Vinci Code is so aggressive and continual that we can only conclude that it is a result of willful ignorance or purposeful malice and hatred. (p. 37)

See also
Criticisms of The Da Vinci Code

External links
Publisher's webpage for The Da Vinci Hoax
 "Dismantling The Da Vinci Code."  A precursor essay by Sandra Miesel.

Da Vinci Hoax, The
Da Vinci Hoax, The
Literature controversies